Alcazar or variant spellings may refer to:

 Alcázar, a type of Islamic castle or palace in Spain and Portugal

Arts, entertainment and literature
 Alcazar (group), a Swedish europop/dance music group
 Alcazar: The Forgotten Fortress, a 1985 video game 
 General Alcazar, a fictional character, friend of Tintin
 , a Spanish comic from 1940
 Teatro Alcázar, a theatre in Madrid, Spain
 Alcazar (Paris) (later Alcazar d'Hiver), a café-concert in Paris 1858–1902
 Alcazar d'Été, a café-concert in Paris 1860–1914

Businesses and organisations
 Alcazar Hotel (disambiguation), the name of several hotels
 Alcazar (airline), a 1993 proposed airline merger

Places
 Alcàsser (Spanish: Alcácer), a municipality in Horta Sud, Valencian Community, Spain
 Alcázar de Colón, a fortified Spanish palace located in Santo Domingo, Dominican Republic
 Alcázar de los Reyes Cristianos, a medieval castle located in the historic centre of Córdoba, Spain
 Alcázar de San Juan, or Alcázar, a town and municipality in Ciudad Real, Castile-La Mancha, Spain
 Alcázar del Rey, a municipality in Cuenca, Castile-La Mancha, Spain
 Alcácer do Sal, a municipality in Setúbal District, Portugal
 Alcázar Genil, a medieval palace located in the historic centre of Granada, Spain
 Alcázar of Jerez de la Frontera, medieval castle in Jerez de la Frontera, Andalusia, Spain
 Alcázar of Segovia, medieval castle located in the city of Segovia, Castile and León, Spain
 Alcázar of Seville, a royal palace in Seville, Spain
 Alcázar of the Caliphs (Córdoba), remains of a former fortified medieval palace located in Córdoba, Spain
 Alcázar of Toledo, a fortified medieval palace located in Toledo, Spain
 El Alcázar, Misiones, a village in Argentina
 Gate of Sevilla (Carmona), also known as the Alcázar de la Puerta de Sevilla, remains of a former fortified medieval palace located in Carmona, Spain
 Los Alcázares, a municipality and a coastal spa town and former fishing village on the western side of the Mar Menor in Murcia, southeastern Spain
 Royal Alcázar of Madrid, a former fortress located at the site of today's Royal Palace of Madrid, Madrid, Spain

People
Baltasar del Alcázar (1530–1606), Spanish poet
Paco Alcácer (born 1993), Spanish footballer

Other uses
El Alcázar, a Spanish newspaper 1936–1988
 Alcázar Basket, a former Spanish basketball team
 Hyundai Alcazar, a crossover SUV

See also
Alcazaba (disambiguation)
Alcalá (disambiguation)
Alcántara (disambiguation)
Qasr (disambiguation)
Alcocer (derives from a diminutive of alcázar), a municipality in Castile-La Mancha, Spain
Alcocer de Planes, a municipality in Valencia, Spain
Alcossebre, a town in Alcalà de Xivert, Valencia, Spain
Ksar el-Kebir (Spanish: Alcazarquivir, Portuguese: Alcácer-Quibir), a city in northwest Morocco
Siege of the Alcázar, 1936 Spanish Civil War event in Toledo